Mokhvor (also Romanized as Makhūr and Mokhūr; also known as Makhor, Mokhūr-e Qareh Qūyūn, Mūkhor, Mukhur, Mukhuri, and Mūkhvor) is a village in, and the capital of, Cheshmeh Sara Rural District of Qarah Quyun District of Showt County, West Azerbaijan province, Iran. At the 2006 National Census, its population was 2,603 in 524 households. The following census in 2011 counted 2,325 people in 608 households. The latest census in 2016 showed a population of 2,321 people in 606 households; it was the largest village in its rural district.

References 

Showt County

Populated places in West Azerbaijan Province

Populated places in Showt County